Lachlan Sepping (born 28 May 2002) is an Australian professional footballer who plays as a midfielder for APEA Akrotiri. He made his professional debut on 8 December 2021 in a FFA Cup match against A-League Men side Sydney FC.

References

External links

2002 births
Living people
Australian soccer players
Association football midfielders
Marconi Stallions FC players
Macarthur FC players
National Premier Leagues players